Różyczka may refer to:

 Little Rose, 2010 Polish drama film
 Różyczka, Greater Poland Voivodeship, village in Poland